Palaiochouni is a village in the municipal unit Valtetsi, Arcadia, Greece. It is situated in the hills on the eastern end of the plain of Megalopoli, at 700 m elevation. It is 2 km east of Mallota, 3 km west of Athinaio, 7 km east of Megalopoli and 19 km southwest of Tripoli. The Greek National Road 7 (Kalamata - Megalopoli - Tripoli) passes through the village. Palaiochouni had a population of 24 in 2011.

Population

External links
History and information about Palaiochouni
 Palaiochouni GTP Travel Pages

See also

List of settlements in Arcadia

References

Valtetsi
Populated places in Arcadia, Peloponnese
Villages in Greece